Chalypyge is a Neotropical genus of firetips in the family Hesperiidae.

Species
Chalypyge chalybea (Scudder, 1872)
Chalypyge zereda (Hewitson, [1866])

References
Natural History Museum Lepidoptera genus database

External links
TOL 
images representing Chalypyge at Consortium for the Barcode of Life

Hesperiidae
Hesperiidae of South America
Hesperiidae genera